Stacy Jefferson (born 7 April 1946) is a British actress. She voiced the characters Vixen and Adder in the acclaimed TV series The Animals of Farthing Wood. She was also the voice of Rosa in the Japanese cartoon Makyu Senjo (1998) and provided voices for the Moomin TV series.

References

External links

1946 births
Living people
20th-century British actresses
21st-century British actresses
British television actresses
British voice actresses
People from Marylebone